The Sinoe oil field is an oil field located on the continental shelf of the Black Sea. It was discovered in 1991 and developed by Petrom. It began production in 1999 and produces oil.

References

Black Sea energy
Oil fields in Romania